Alexander Kadeikin (born October 4, 1993) is a Russian professional ice hockey player, who is currently playing for Salavat Yulaev Ufa of the Kontinental Hockey League (KHL). Kadeikin was drafted 201st overall by the Detroit Red Wings in the 2014 NHL Entry Draft.

Playing career
Kadeikin made his debut during the 2010–11 season for Mytischenskie Atlanty of the MHL. Kadeikin recorded ten goals and 19 assists in 48 games. During the 2011–12 season, in his second year with Mytischenskie Atlanty, Kadeikin recorded 22 goals and 36 assists in 60 games for

In the 2012–13 season, Kadeikin made his professional debut for Atlant Moscow Oblast, where he skated in two games. He also appeared in 26 games for their junior club, where he recorded 14 goals and 29 assists in 26 games.

During the 2013–14 season, Kadeikin was the team's leading scorer, recording eight goals and 15 assists in 54 games for Atlant Moscow Oblast.

In the following 2014–15 season, after registering 1 assist in 9 games with Atlant, Kadeikin was traded to SKA Saint Petersburg in exchange for Anton Malyshev on September 26, 2014.

On May 22, 2018, Kadeikin signed a one-year contract as a free agent with Salavat Yulaev Ufa to commence in the 2018–19 season.

International play

Kadeikin represented the MHL Red Stars at the 2012 IIHF U20 Challenge Cup of Asia, where he won a gold medal. Kadeikin was tied with Maxim Shalunov as the teams' leading scorer, recording four goals and ten assists in four games.

Career statistics

Regular season and playoffs

International

References

External links

1993 births
Living people
Atlant Moscow Oblast players
Detroit Red Wings draft picks
Lokomotiv Yaroslavl players
Russian ice hockey forwards
Salavat Yulaev Ufa players
SKA Saint Petersburg players
People from Elektrostal
Sportspeople from Moscow Oblast